Ray Illingworth captained the English cricket team in Australia in 1970–71, playing as England in the 1970–71 Ashes series against the Australians and as the MCC in their other matches on the tour. They had a successful tour; however, it was an acrimonious one, as Illingworth's team often argued with their own management and the Australian umpires. When they arrived, the Australian selector Neil Harvey called them "rubbish", and others labelled them "Dad's Army" because of the seniority of the players, whose average age was over 30, but these experienced veterans beat the younger Australian team. They are the only touring team to play a full Test series in Australia without defeat.

The rest of the world
In 1969–70, Australia were overwhelmed by South Africa in their last series until 1994. The 1970 South African tour of England was cancelled due to the Basil d'Oliveira Affair and concerns over anti-apartheid demonstrations that had led to barbed wire at Lord's. Rather than send an unprepared team to Australia, a Rest of the World XI was created mostly from overseas cricketers playing in the County Championship, managed by Freddie Brown, captained by Gary Sobers, and including the South Africans Eddie Barlow, Graeme Pollock, Peter Pollock, Mike Procter and Barry Richards. They could not be regarded as a national Test team, and the matches were given the status of 'unofficial Tests', but the runs scored and wickets taken were added to official Test statistics until it was decided by the I.C.C. that they should not count. England were beaten 4–1, but the only surprise was that they managed to win one game and almost won two others against what was arguably the strongest cricket team ever assembled.

England's unbeaten run 1968-71
At the beginning of the tour, England had lost only 1 of their previous 26 Tests and were halfway through their record-breaking 27 consecutive Tests without defeat, winning 9 and drawing 18 (including the abandoned Test at Melbourne). This record was not recognised at the time, as the games against the Rest of the World XI, some of which England lost, were counted as Test matches. The record was subsequently equalled by Clive Lloyd's West Indies in 1981–84.

1–1 (5 Tests) vs Australia in 1968, Australia winning the First Test at Old Trafford  by 159 runs
0–0 (3 Tests) in Pakistan 1968-69
2–0 (3 Tests) vs the West Indies 1969
2–0 (3 Tests) vs New Zealand 1969
2–0 (7 Tests) in Australia 1970-71
1–0 (2 Tests) in New Zealand 1970-71
1–0 (3 Tests) vs Pakistan 1971
0–1 (3 Tests) vs India 1971; India won the Third Test at the Oval  by 4 wickets

The manager
I hope to God we will get a result. I hope that both teams go into the match with a result in mind.
David Clark
The series in Australia "emphasised the gulf between players and administrators", and John Snow wrote: 'I was sick of the biased attitude and incompetence which was apparent in cricket administration. David Clark was the MCC tour manager, Bernard Thomas of Warwickshire the assistant manager and physiotherapist, and G.C.A. Saulez the scorer. Clark had been the amateur captain of Kent in 1949–51 who was described by Ray Illingworth as "an amiable, but somewhat ineffectual man". and there were soon divisions between him and the players. John Snow had bowled over 50 eight-ball overs in the First Test and was rested for the state match against Western Australia, but Clark insisted that he practice in the nets with the other bowlers. Snow bowled a couple of desultory overs and Clark berated him for five minutes after which Snow told him "that as far as my good conduct money was concerned he could swallow it" and went walkabout until the next day. Ray Illingworth smoothed things over, but in Second Test Clark criticised both captains for cautious play and England for their short-pitched bowling. When asked by the press if he would prefer four more draws or a 3-1 Australian victory he replied "I'd rather see four results" as if they were drawn there might be no Ashes left to play for. Ray Illingworth only discovered this when he was asked for a comment by a journalist in the morning and the team when they read it in the newspapers. As a result, Illingworth effectively took over the running of the tour with the support of the players and Clark's influence declined. Clark's only ally was the vice-captain Colin Cowdrey, also from Kent, who became isolated as a result. Unlike his predecessors Illingworth insisted on good hotel accommodation, decent sporting facilities, better travel arrangements, higher allowances and pay and fought hard to get them, which was greatly appreciated by the players. In the final Sydney Test Clark tried to push Illingworth back onto the field when he took the team off because of the crowd throwing beer cans after the Snow-Jenner incident. A furious Illingworth said he would not return until the playing area had been cleared and the crowd had calmed down and objected to Clark constantly siding with the Australians against his own team. When the team returned to England Illingworth said that "all hell would break loose" if anyone was denied his good conduct bonus (as had happened with Fred Trueman in the West Indies in 1953–54), but this did not happen. However, Geoffrey Boycott and John Snow had to report to Lord's for a dressing down for their behaviour by the Secretary of the MCC Billy Griffith.

The captain
<blockquote>
Ray Illingworth's England side in 1970-71 were mentally the toughest English side I played against, and the experience of playing against them first up in my Test career reinforced what I had learnt in the backyard. Test cricket was not for the faint of heart. Illingworth subjected us to a mental intimidation by aggressive field placings, and physical intimidation by constant use of his pace attack, ably led by one of the best fast bowlers of my experience, John Snow. Winning to Illingworth was something he expected of himself and demanded of his team.
Greg Chappell</blockquote>
When Ray Illingworth left Yorkshire in 1968 after a contract dispute it looked like the 36-year-old off-spinner's Test career was over. However, he transferred to Leicestershire and was made county captain. Although he had never been captain his great experience and knowledge of the game were widely believed to have guided Yorkshire to their County Championship victories in 1966, 1967 and 1968. He had an immediate effect on the unfancied Midlands side, which would take them to four one day trophies in the early 1970s and the County Championship in 1975. The selectors had long regarded Kent's Colin Cowdrey as England's natural captain, but he broke an Achilles tendon early in the season and Illingworth was his surprise replacement after only a month as county captain. Illingworth had been in and out of the national side for years and had taken 20 wickets (13.30) against India in 1967 and 13 more (22.39) against Australia in 1968. He was chosen over his rivals such as former captain Brian Close or vice-captain Tom Graveney as he was not a threat to Cowdrey's long-term captaincy due to his age and inability to establish a regular spot in the Test team. In the Second Test against the West Indies at Lord's England collapsed to 61/5, but the new skipper made a forceful 113 out of the last 155 runs and became a hero. He beat both the West Indies and New Zealand 2-0 and remained captain even when Cowdrey recovered. In 1970 Illingworth had yet to lose a Test and overall he captained England in 31 Tests in 1969-73, winning 12, drawing 14 and losing 5. The Yorkshireman was 'tough, combative, grudging, shrewd, and an instinctive reader of the game', and an experienced, non-nonsense captain who expected his team to play like professionals. David Gower wrote 'no matter how highly Ray might regard you as a player he would not have you in his team, come hell or high water, unless he was utterly convinced that you could do the job he had allocated to you'. He encouraged 'difficult' players like Geoff Boycott and John Snow who both responded with their best Test performances on the tour. 'Most of all, because he insisted on his "own side", he was able to get the best out of his players, both mentally and physically. He built up a tremendous team spirit which stood us in good stead on numerous occasions'. They tended to close ranks and treat the opposition, umpires, press and public as the enemy, an attitude that became prevalent amongst Test teams in the 1970s.

Batting
England had a formidable batting line up and it is no coincidence that in this period they played 27 Tests without defeat. The weak Australian bowling was unable to dismiss them twice in the same Test, except the last which they lost anyway. They were exceptionally strong at the top of the order; Boycott and Luckhurst opened in the first five Tests, then Boycott and Edrich in the 6th and Edrich and Luckhurst in the 7th as injuries took hold. Together they added 995 runs for the first wicket at an average of 90.45, with five century and three half-century opening stands. The "Great Accumulator" Geoff Boycott had his best series making 657 runs (93.85) with two unbeaten centuries and his name became a byword for long, stonewalling innings. It is noteworthy that he performed best under Illingworth, an old Yorkshire colleague of great seniority who had no objection to his slow, deliberate play. John Edrich also had his most prolific series, making 648 runs (72.00) and two centuries, a stalwart left-hander with a formidable defence and always a thorn in Australia's side.p172, Swanton, 1986 Brian Luckhurst was a Kent opener who had already 'debuted' against the Rest of the World and made an unbeaten 113 in England's only victory. He did well again, making 455 runs (56.87) and two centuries despite badly bruised fingers, but unlike Boycott he was willing to hit the ball and was named a Wisden Cricketer of the Year in 1971. England's middle order was more fragile. In 1970 the vice captain Colin Cowdrey was the only man to have played over a hundred Tests and had made more runs (7,228) than any other player, but was in the sunset of his career and failed on tour. He had always dreamed of leading England to victory in Australia, but each of his record six tours down under was made under a different captain and this was his fourth as vice-captain. Keith Fletcher was at the start of a promising career and had made few runs as yet, but in the 1970s he would become a leading England runmaker. Basil d'Oliveira was the best of the strokemakers, making 369 runs (36.90) in the series with a century at Melbourne. He was a brilliant Cape-Coloured batsman who qualified for England by residence in his mid-thirties, an unflappable player with a low backlift and powerful arms whose gentle, smiling face concealed a very determined man. His match-winning 158 against Australia at the Oval in 1968 led to his selection for the 1968-69 tour of South Africa and a cricketing crisis. John Hampshire was a dashing Yorkshire batsman who is the only England player to make a century on debut at Lord's, 107 against the West Indies in 1969, but never made another and was dropped after a short Test career. England's lower middle order added real strength with the wicket-keeper Alan Knott worth his place for his perky, unorthodox batting alone. Skipper Ray Illingworth made 476 runs (52.89) against the Rest of the World in 1970 and did well again in Australia. John Snow began and ended his cricketing life as a batsman and in 1969-71 averaged 34.50 in Tests, so could be regarded as another all-rounder.

Bowling
I have not met John Snow, the outstanding personality and most dominating cricketer of the 1970-71 Anglo-Australian series...To me, he is one of the most faithful and effective servants Nemesis ever employed...Never did he lose that aura of menace. When he loped in to bowl he wore malevolence like Mandrake wore a cloak...But for him, Redpath, Walters, Ian Chappell and probably even Paul Sheahan must have bloomed as most of them did against the West Indians in 1968-69.
Richard Whitington
When England arrived in Australia Ray Illingworth boasted of his new ball fast bowlers "The Derbyshire Demon" Alan Ward and "The Abominable Snow Man" John Snow. Instead he returned to England and the young Bob Willis was flown out to Australia as his replacement, though few people realised that this tall, gangling bowler with the chest on action would be England's fast bowling spearhead for the next 14 years. John Augustine Snow dominated the series with 31 wickets (22.83). Although the son of a country vicar who published two volumes of poetry, Snow revelled in his reputation as a big, fast bowler and emerged as Fred Trueman's successor in 1967-68 when he took a record 27 wickets (18.66) in the West Indies. He usually bowled within himself at fast-medium, but sent down a couple of quick balls every over as he varied his pace and Australia had no real answer to his fast, short pitched bowling.p85, Kelly Snow had a reputation for being mercurial - he took only 7 wickets (71.57) in the state matches - strong-willed and difficult to handle, and his autobiography was suitably entitled Cricket Rebel. Keith Fletcher said "In 1970/71 John Snow was at his peak, obtaining pace and movement off the seam and troubling all the upper-order batsmen". Ken Shuttleworth and Peter Lever provided good support to the two quick bowlers, Lever took 7/83 against the Rest of the World at the Oval, and Shuttleworth 5/47 in the First Test at Brisbane, but neither held down a regular Test place. Basil d'Oliveira helped with his tidy medium pace swing bowling and occasional off-spin. Illingworth himself was an off-spinner of nagging accuracy who contained batsmen rather than took wickets, conceding only 1.91 runs an over in Tests. If "Illy" was proof that spin bowlers mature slowly his partner Derek Underwood was a first class bowler from his teens and he would take his 100th Test wicket and 1,000th First Class wicket on the tour aged only 25. He bowled immaculate slow-medium spinners and used to say that bowling was a "low mentality profession: plug away, line and length, until there's a mistake" as sooner or later every batsmen would make a mistake. On damp English wickets he earned the nickname "Deadly" for his ability to make the ball leap and turn, as when he took 7/50 against Australia at The Oval in 1968 to win the match and square the series with five minutes to spare. The reserve spinner Don Wilson was Illingworth's old Yorkshire "spin twin", but he and Underwood kept him out of the England team, like the other two he was an accurate bowler rather than a wicket-taker.

Fielding
There is some suggestion that we might be an elderly fielding side. But we shall work really hard at our fielding and make sure it reaches a high standard.
Ray Illingworth
Ray Illingworth was an excellent close fielder and expected the same from his teams, once remarking 'When you've caught it get the bugger in straight away and get on w'th the game'. As a result, the England team fielded well throughout the series. Alan Knott had been chosen as a Wisden Cricketer of the Year in 1970 and was regarded as the finest keeper in the world. In this series he dismissed 24 Australian batsmen, a new Test record and Rod Marsh admitted that he learned much of his trade from watching "Knotty" in the 1970-71 series.p200, Swanton, 1986 Knott continually exercised before play and between balls and was a highly entertaining player whose partnership with his team-mate Derek Underwood was legendary. Others thought that the reserve keeper Bob Taylor was even better, a quiet, unassuming player whose wicketkeeping was so tidy as to be invisible. Colin Cowdrey was an outstanding slip fielder who had held 113 catches by 1970, a record by a non-wicketkeeper in Tests at the time. He was joined in the slips by John Edrich, though he was a specialist gully fielder. Batsmen were sometimes lulled by Basil d'Oliveira's slowness in the outfield, but he had a very strong throwing arm and could hit the stumps like a bullet. Geoff Boycott had once been an indifferent outfielder, but worked hard on his game and was now able to throw the ball strongly with either arm. The ever-mercurial John Snow often lounged around the outfield - ignoring the game if he felt it wasn't going anywhere - but had a fine throwing arm when he wanted to use it. The late arrival Bob Willis was an excellent slip and close fielder.

Touring team

First Test - Brisbane

See Main Article - 1970-71 Ashes series

Second Test - Perth

See Main Article - 1970-71 Ashes series

Third Test - Melbourne

See Main Article - 1970-71 Ashes series

First One Day International - Melbourne

See Main Article - 1970-71 Ashes series

Fourth Test - Sydney

See Main Article - 1970-71 Ashes series

Fifth Test - Melbourne

See Main Article - 1970-71 Ashes series

Sixth Test - Adelaide

See Main Article - 1970-71 Ashes series

Seventh Test - Sydney

See Main Article - 1970-71 Ashes series

References

Bibliography
 Peter Arnold, The Illustrated Encyclopaedia of World of Cricket, W.H. Smith, 1985
 Ashley Brown, A Pictorial History of Cricket, Bison Books Ltd, 1988
 Criss Freddi, The Guinness Book of Cricket Blunders, Guinness Publishing, 1996
 David Gower, Heroes and Contemporaries, Granada Publishing Ltd, 1985
 Tom Graveney and Norman Miller, The Ten Greatest Test Teams, Sidgewick and Jackson, 1988
 John Snow, Cricket Rebel: An Autobiography, Littlehampton Book Services Ltd, 1976
 E.W. Swanton, Swanton in Australia with MCC 1946-1975, Fontana, 1977
 Richard Whitington, Captain Outrageous? Cricket in the seventies, Stanley Paul, 1972

Annual reviews
 Playfair Cricket Annual 1971
 Wisden Cricketers' Almanack 1971

Further reading
 Geoffrey Boycott, Boycott: The Autobiography, Pan Books, 2006
 Mark Browning, Rod Marsh: A Life in Cricket, Rosenberg Publishing, 2003
 Ian Brayshaw, The Chappell Era, ABC Enterprises, 1984
 Greg Chappell, Old Hands Showed The Way, Test Series Official Book 1986-87, The Clashes for the Ashes, Australia vs England, Playbill Sport Publication, 1986
 Ian Chappell, Austin Robertson and Paul Rigby, Chappelli Has the Last Laugh, Lansdowne Press, 1980
 Ian Chappell and Ashley Mallett, Hitting Out: The Ian Chappell Story, Orion, 2006
 Chris Cowdrey and Jonathan Smith, Good Enough, Pelham Books, 1986
 Colin Cowdrey, M. C. C. The Autobiography of a Cricketer, Coronet Books, 1977
 Basil d'Oliveira, Time to Declare: An Autobiography, Star, 1982
 Basil d'Oliveira, Basil d'Oliveira: Cricket and Controversy, Sphere, 2005
 Bill Frindall, The Wisden Book of Test Cricket 1877-1978, Wisden, 1979
 Colin Firth, Pageant of Cricket, The Macmillan Company of Australia,1987
 Chris Harte, A History of Australian Cricket, Andre Deutsch, 1993
 Ed Jaggard, Garth: The Story of Graham McKenzie, Fremantle Arts Centre Press, 1993
 Ken Kelly and David Lemmon, Cricket Reflections: Five Decades of Cricket Photographs, Heinemann, 1985
 Dennis Lillee, Lillee, My Life in Cricket, Methuen Australia, 1982
 Dennis Lillee, Menace: the Autobiography, Headline Book Publishing, 2003
 Brian Luckhurst and Mike Baldwin, Boot Boy to President, KOS Media, 2004
 Ashley Mallett, Rowdy, Lynton Publications, 1973
 Ashley Mallett, Spin Out, Garry Sparke & Associates, 1977
 Ashley Mallett, One of a Kind: The Doug Walters Story, Orion, 2009
 Rod Marsh, The Gloves of Irony, Pan, 1999
 Adrian McGregor, Greg Chappell, Collins, 1985
 Mark Peel, The Last Roman: A Biography of Colin Cowdrey, Andre Deutsch Ltd, 1999
 Ray Robinson, On Top Down Under, Cassell, 1975
 Lou Rowan, The Umpires Story with an Analysis of the laws of cricket, Jack Pollard, 1972
 Keith Stackpole and Alan Trenglove, Not Just For Openers, Stockwell Press, 1974
 Mike Stevenson, Illy: A Biography Of Ray Illingworth, Midas Books, 1978
 E.W. Swanton(ed), The Barclays World of Cricket, Collins, 1986
 Derek Underwood, Beating the Bat: An Autobiography, S.Paul, 1975
 Bob Willis, Lasting the Pace, Collins, 1985

Videos and DVDs
 Allan Border and David Gower, The Best of the Ashes - 1970 - 1987, 2 Entertain Video, 1991
 David Steele, England Cricket Six of the Best: The Seventies'', A Sharpe Focus Production for Green Umbrella, 2009 (shows England's 299 run victory in the 4th Test at Sydney)

External links
 CricketArchive tour itinerary

1970 in Australian cricket
1970 in English cricket
1970–71 Australian cricket season
1971 in Australian cricket
1971 in English cricket
1970-71
International cricket competitions from 1970–71 to 1975
1970-71